Godless is a 2016 Bulgarian drama film directed by . It was screened in the Discovery section at the 2016 Toronto International Film Festival.

Cast
 Irena Ivanova as Gana
 Ventzislav Konstantinov as Aleko
 Ivan Nalbantov as Yoan
 Dimitar Petkov as The Judge
 Alexandr Triffonov as Pavel

Accolades and awards
Godless won the prestigious Golden Leopard at the 2016 Locarno International Film Festival; Irena Ivanova also won the best actress award at Locarno for the film.

At the Sarajevo Film Festival in August 2016, Godless won the Special Jury Prize (an award of 10,000 €) and Ivanova won the Heart of Sarajevo for Best Actress (an award of 2.500 €).

At the 2016 Golden Rose National Film Festival in Varna, Godless won the top prize—the Golden Rose Award—as well as the prizes for best director (Petrova), best actress (Ivanova) and best actor (Nalbantov); Krum Rodriguez was awarded the prize for best cinematography for both Godless and Glory.

At the Reykjavík International Film Festival in September–October 2016, Godless won the top prize (the Golden Puffin). At the 2016 Warsaw Film Festival, Godless won the FIPRESCI Award for Best Debut from Eastern Europe. At the 2016 Mumbai Film Festival, Godless won the Silver Gateway award (at the international competition).

References

External links
 
 

2016 films
2016 drama films
Golden Leopard winners
Bulgarian drama films
2010s Bulgarian-language films